Gianfranco Pannone is an Italian film and television director.

Biography 
After graduating in Cinema history and criticism at La Sapienza University of Rome, he graduated in Directing at the CSC (National Cinema School). Between 1990 and 1998, he directed and produced the documentary films Piccola America, Lettere dall’America and L’America a Roma, which together make up the Trilogy of America; and later Latina/Littoria (2001), a French-Italian documentary-film, which was awarded the prize for the best non-fiction work at the Torino Film Festival in 2001 and in 2003 at the Mediterranean Film Festival – Rai Award. Among his short and medium-length films are Kelibia/Mazara (1998, co-directed with T. Ben Abdallah), Pomodori (1999), Sirena operaia (2000), Viaggio intorno alla mia casa (2001), Venezia, la città che affonda (2001, co-directed with M. Visalberghi), Pietre, miracoli e petrolio, Benvenue chez Casetti (2006). Also the feature film 100 anni della nostra storia (2006, co-directed with Marco Puccioni), made it to the final five of David di Donatello in 2007; the docu-series Cronisti di strada (2007) and, in recent years, the shorts Immota manet (2009), Linee di confine (2010), Aprilia (2011). Le pietre sacre della Basilicata (2012), Graziano e le sue donne (2013) Io che amo solo te (2004) is his fiction feature film . His last documentary films are: Il sol dell’avvenire (2008), which was conceived and written with John Fasanella and was presented as a special event at the International Film Festival of Locarno, at Viennale in 2008, at the International Documentary Film Festival of London and in the final five of Nastri D’Argento in 2009; ma che Storia..., a montage film produced by Cinecittà Luce and presented during the International Venice Film Festival in 2010, as well as in many cities across the world as representative of the 150th anniversary of the Unification of Italy; Scorie in libertà (2011-2012), presented in the International section of Cinemambiente Torino Festival in 2012 and, as a special event, at the Festival del Nuovo Cinema di Pesaro in the same year. The documentary Ebrei a Roma was presented as a Special Event at the Rome International Film Festival in 2012. This year he has completed the medium-length Trit cme la bula and the feature Sul vulcano.

His works have earned him awards, have allowed him to participate in many Italian and international festivals and are aired on major European television. Pannone has also directed several shows as a theatre director, including, Guerra civile in 2006, presented in the same year at the Festival Dei Due Mondi in Spoleto. He is co-founder of Doc/It  and he is an active member of the association 100autori.

He teaches documentary filmmaking at Dams in Roma Tre University and documentary direction at CSC – National Cinema School in Rome and in L'Aquila. He has also conducted numerous workshops on documentary writing and directing. He has been editor of the Docdoc column in the online journal ildocumentario.it and he has written several essays and books about cinema, including Il sol dell’avvenire – Diario di un film politicamente scorretto (with Giovanni Fasanella) edited by Chiarelettere, L’officina del documentario (with Mario Balsamo) edited by Cdg, and Docdoc – 10 anni di cinema e altre storie edited by Mephite-Quaderni di Cinemasud. He is responsible for the Open Eyes Section, dedicated to international documentaries, within the Med Film Festival in Rome.

Filmography 
 La giostra (cm. di finzione per Csc), 1989
 Lettera da Roma (doc. breve per Csc), 1990
 Piccola America (film doc. lg), 1991
 Bambini a Napoli (doc. breve), 1993
 Lettere dall’America (doc. mm), 1995
 Kenia (doc. cm), 1996
 Ritorno a Littoria (doc. cm), 1997
 Ombre del Sud (doc. antologico), 1997
 Le leggi dimenticate (doc. breve), 1997
 L’America a Roma (film doc. lg), 1998
 Kelibia/Mazara (corto di fiction, in co-regia con Tarek Ben Abdallah), 1998
 Gli ultimi giorni di Ciano (doc. breve), 1998
 Il tempio di Venere e  Roma (doc. breve, in co-regia con Antonio Pettinelli), 1999
 Pomodori (doc.mm), 1999
 Così vicini, così lontani (doc. breve, in co-regia con Tarek Ben Abdallah), 1999
 Anna delle saline (doc. breve), 1999
 Viaggio intorno alla mia casa (doc. mm), 2000
 Ferie: gli italiani e le vacanze (doc. breve), 2000
 Sirena operaia (doc. mm), 2000
 Venezia, la città che affonda (doc. mm, in co-regia con Marco Visalberghi), 2001
 Latina/Littoria (film doc. lg), 2001
 Cerimonie: gli italiani, la Chiesa, lo Stato (doc. breve), 2002
 Toscana: lungo il fiume (doc. breve), 2002
 Pietre, miracoli e petrolio (doc. mm), 2004
 Io che amo solo te (film di finzione lg), 2004
 Dal dagherrotipo al digitale (doc. breve), 2005
 Benvenue chez Casetti (doc. seriale per Visages d’Europe), 2006
 100 anni della nostra storia (film doc. lg, in co-regia con Marco Piccioni), 2006
 Cronisti di strada (doc. in tre puntate), 2007
 Una Questi…one poco privata (doc. breve), 2007
 Il sol dell'avvenire (film doc. lg), 2008
 Immota manet (doc. breve), 2009
 Linee di confine (doc. breve), 2010
 Agnelli, l’America a Torino (doc. mediometraggio), 2010
 ma che Storia... (film doc. lungometraggio), 2010
 Aprilia, 75 anni di vita 150 anni di Storia (doc. breve), 2011
 Scorie in libertà (film doc. lg), 2012
 Ebrei a Roma (doc mm), 2012
 Le pietre sacre della Basilicata (cm), 2012
 Trit ‘me la bula (doc mm), 2013
 Sul vulcano (film lungometraggio), 2014

Awards 
 Premio della giuria al Festival del Cinema di Roma, 1993
 Premio Bizarri, 1999
 Premio miglior documentario italiano al Torino Film Festival, 2001
 Premio miglior documentario al Leone d'oro, 2015

Bibliography 

Simone Brioni. “Transnationalism and Nostalgia: Gianfranco Pannone’s ‘Trilogy of America’”. Journal of Italian Cinema and Media Studies 4.3 (2016), pp. 403–419.

References

External links
 
 Complete Filmography on Cinemaitaliano

Italian film directors
Living people
Year of birth missing (living people)